Au Printemps is the third studio album by Jacques Brel. Also known as Jacques Brel 3, the original record was released in 1958. The album was reissued on 23 September 2003 under the title Au Printemps as part of the 16-CD box set Boîte à Bonbons by Barclay (980 816-5).

Track listing 

 Tracks 1–10 constituted the original 1958 album. 
 Tracks 11–13 were added to the album when it was reissued as part of the 16-CD box set Boîte à Bonbons.

Credits 

 Jacques Brel – composer, vocals
 André Popp – orchestra conductor 
 François Rauber – orchestra conductor 
 Jean-Marie Guérin – mastering
 Henri Guilbaud – photography

References 

Jacques Brel albums
1958 albums
Philips Records albums
Barclay (record label) albums
Universal Records albums
French-language albums
Albums conducted by François Rauber
Albums conducted by André Popp